Alberto Gutierrez may refer to:

 Alberto B. Gutiérrez, Mexican General during the Cristero War (192629)
 Alberto Díaz Gutiérrez (19282001), Cuban photographer
 Alberto Gutierrez; see List of Philippine Basketball Association players
 Alberto Gutiérrez, supporting actor in Nada personal (telenovela)
 Alberto Gutiérrez (born 1980), member of the 1997 FIFA U-17 World Championship squads